Thomas Edward Tweed (11 December 1904 — 23 March 1973) was a Sri Lankan first-class cricketer.

Tweed was born at Colombo in December 1904. He was educated in Colombo at both the Royal College and S. Thomas' College, before studying in England at the University of Cambridge. While studying at Cambridge, he played first-class cricket for Cambridge University Cricket Club in 1925 and 1926, making four appearances. He scored 97 runs in these four matches, at an average of 19.40 and with a highest score of 24. With his right-arm medium pace bowling, he took 5 wickets with best figures of 2 for 30. Tweed died at Colombo in March 1973.

References

External links

1904 births
1973 deaths
Cricketers from Colombo
Alumni of Royal College, Colombo
Alumni of S. Thomas' College, Mount Lavinia
Alumni of the University of Cambridge
Sri Lankan cricketers
Cambridge University cricketers